The girls' 200 metres event at the 2010 Youth Olympic Games was held on 19–22 August 2010 in Bishan Stadium.

Schedule

Results

Heats

Finals

Final C
wind: +0.5 m/s

Final B
wind: +0.2 m/s

Final A
wind: +0.7 m/s

External links
 iaaf.org - Women's 200m
 

Athletics at the 2010 Summer Youth Olympics